Augusta of Reuss-Ebersdorf (19 January 1757 – 16 November 1831), was by marriage the Duchess of Saxe-Coburg-Saalfeld. She was the maternal grandmother of Queen Victoria and the paternal grandmother of Albert, Prince Consort.

Family
Augusta was born on 19 January 1757, the second child of Heinrich XXIV, Count Reuss of Ebersdorf and his wife Countess Karoline Ernestine of Erbach-Schönberg. Her birthplace, Ebersdorf, was a center of Pietism in Thuringia and Augusta's grandparents were ardent admirers of this religious movement. Augusta's great-aunt Countess Erdmuthe Dorothea of Reuss-Ebersdorf was married to Count Nicholas Louis von Zinzendorf und Pottendorf, leader of the revivalist Moravian Church. This background explains the deep religious feelings of Duchess Augusta in later years.

Marriage
Her father commissioned a portrait of Augusta as Artemisia by the painter Johann Heinrich Tischbein. Count Heinrich XXIV showed this painting during the Perpetual Diet so potential marriage candidates were aware of his beautiful daughter.

In Ebersdorf on 13 June 1777 Augusta married Francis, Duke of Saxe-Coburg-Saalfeld. Duke Francis previously acquired the Artemisia painting for four times the original price because he was deeply in love with Augusta, but he was already obliged to marry his relative Princess Sophie of Saxe-Hildburghausen. Princess Sophie died 7 months after the wedding, so the young Duke was free to wed again.

During her marriage, Augusta bore her husband 10 children, though only seven of them survived to adulthood; some of their children played important roles in European history: Victoria, Duchess of Kent, and King Leopold I of Belgium.

Issue

Notable descendants
Countess Augusta was the grandmother of many notable monarchs of Europe, including both Queen Victoria of the United Kingdom (through her mother Victoria) and her husband, Prince Albert (through his father Ernst), King Consort of Portugal Ferdinand II (through his father Prince Ferdinand of Saxe-Coburg and Gotha), and also Empress Carlota of Mexico and her brother Leopold II of Belgium (through their father Leopold I who was elected King of the Belgians on 26 June 1831).

Ancestry

References

Gertraude Bachmann: Natur und Kunst in den Reisetagebüchern der Herzogin Auguste Caroline Sophie von Sachsen-Coburg-Saalfeld (text of the lecture from the 175th anniversary of Duchess Augusta's death on 16 November 2006 at the Naturkunde-Museum Coburg), Coburg 2006.

|-

1757 births
1831 deaths
People from Saalburg-Ebersdorf
Duchesses of Saxe-Coburg-Saalfeld
House of Wettin
Princesses of Reuss
Daughters of monarchs